The men's pole vault event  at the 1977 European Athletics Indoor Championships was held on 12 March in San Sebastián.

Results

References

Pole vault at the European Athletics Indoor Championships
Pole